William Windom (May 10, 1827January 29, 1891) was an American politician from Minnesota. He served as U.S. Representative from 1859 to 1869, and as U.S. Senator from 1870 to January 1871, from March 1871 to March 1881, and from November 1881 to 1883. He also served two non-consecutive times as Secretary of the Treasury from March to November 1881, and from 1889 to 1891, under three Presidents. He was a Republican. He was the great-grandfather of actor William Windom, who was named for him.

Early life
Windom was born in Belmont County, Ohio. He moved to Minnesota Territory in 1855 and settled in the town of Winona on the banks of the Mississippi River in southeastern Minnesota.

Political career

Windom was elected U.S. Representative in 1859, filling one of Minnesota's two at-large seats. He was re-elected in 1861, again at-large. By 1862, Minnesota had established Congressional districts, and in that year he was re-elected from Minnesota's 1st congressional district; and also in 1864 and 1866. He was not a candidate in 1868.

Senator Daniel S. Norton died on July 13, 1870. On July 15, Governor Alexander Ramsey appointed Windom to the resulting vacancy, to serve until the legislature elected a replacement. When the legislature  met in January 1871, they elected Ozora P. Stearns to serve the last 41 days of the current term (January 22 – March 3), and elected Windom to serve the next full term, beginning March 4. Windom was re-elected in 1877, and served until March 7, 1881, when he resigned to become Secretary of the Treasury.

In the United States Senate, Windom was recognized as a strong advocate of railroad regulation. Indeed, in December 1872, he became the chairman of the Senate Select Committee on Transportation Routes to the Seaboard to investigate transportation practices.  The select committee's report was submitted to the Senate on April 24, 1874, and was ordered to be printed the same day.  The analytical report, among other conclusions and recommendations, recommended a Bureau of Commerce; it would have all the basic elements of the Interstate Commerce Commission, as created thirteen years later, in January 1887, and other follow-on.  Almost 35 years later the Progressive Era Inland Waterways Commission, looking into similar issues and many new ones, would recognize the "Report of the Windom Select Committee" as the third epoch in the movement toward developing the inland waterways of the country.

In 1880, Windom sought the Republican nomination for President. But at the Republican National Convention, he received only 10 votes on the first ballot. The convention deadlocked, and after over 30 ballots began to consider choosing a "dark horse" candidate, such as Windom. But instead of Windom, they nominated James A. Garfield, who was subsequently elected president.

On March 7, 1881, Windom resigned from the Senate and was appointed Secretary of the Treasury by Garfield, taking office the next day.

Windom served as Treasury Secretary until November 13, when he resigned. On October 26, he was again elected Senator by the Minnesota Legislature, this time to fill the vacancy left by his own resignation. He re-assumed his Senate seat on November 15 and served until the end of his term on March 3, 1883. He sought re-election in 1882, but was defeated.

In 1883, he moved to New York City, where he practiced law until 1889. After President Benjamin Harrison was elected in 1888, he appointed Windom as Secretary of the Treasury.  Taking office on March 8, 1889, Windom served as Treasury Secretary until his death on January 29, 1891. He died while giving a speech in the famous Delmonico's Steak House in New York City.

Memorials

Windom's engraved portrait appeared on the $2.00 denomination of U.S. silver certificates from 1891 to 1896.
The revenue cutter USS Windom was named for him, as was a World War II Liberty Ship.

The city of Windom in Cottonwood County, Minnesota is named for him.

Windom College in Montevideo, Minnesota is named for him.

Windom Park in Winona, Minnesota is named after him, as are Windom Northeast Park and Windom South Park in Minneapolis.

The Windom and Windom Park neighborhoods in Minneapolis are named after him.

William Windom is the namesake of Windom Peak, in Colorado.

References

Treasury biography

1827 births
1891 deaths
19th-century American politicians
People from Belmont County, Ohio
American Quakers
United States Secretaries of the Treasury
Republican Party United States senators from Minnesota
Benjamin Harrison administration cabinet members
Garfield administration cabinet members
Arthur administration cabinet members
New York (state) Republicans
Republican Party members of the United States House of Representatives from Minnesota
Chairmen of the Senate Committee on Foreign Relations